Salama bint Hamdan Al Nahyan is an Emirati woman who is the wife of Mohamed bin Zayed Al Nahyan, President of the United Arab Emirates and ruler of Abu Dhabi. She is known for her philanthropic activities and arts patronage.

Biography
Salama bint Hamdan is a member of the ruling family of Abu Dhabi, House of Nahyan. Her father, Sheikh Hamdan bin Mohammed Al Nahyan, was a former UAE deputy prime minister. His mother is Maryam bint Abdullah bin Sulayem Al Falasi who died on 9 February 2023.

She is the founder and president of a philanthropic foundation with her name, Salama bint Hamdan Al Nahyan Foundation, based in Abu Dhabi. She is also the chair of the Abu Dhabi Art Host Committee. She is the owner of various significant paintings which were produced by Pablo Picasso and Rudolf Ernst and also, modern Egyptian painting in addition to Islamic ceramics. In 2010 she bought a work by Damien Hirst from the White Cube gallery for $4 million.

Her other public roles include chair of the General Women's Union, president of the Supreme Council for Motherhood and Childhood, and supreme chair of the Family Development Foundation. She is the recipient of the woman personality of the year award in 2011 by the Middle East Excellence Awards Institute and the Sharjah voluntary work award in 2012. She was among the Canvass magazine's Power 50 in relation to her activities in Middle Eastern art and culture.

Marriage and children
In 1981 Salama bint Hamdan married Mohamed bin Zayed Al Nahyan with whom she has nine children, four sons and five daughters. They also have two adopted daughters, and 16 grandchildren.

Sheikha Mariam 
Sheikh Khaled
Sheikha Shamsa 
Sheikh Theyab 
Sheikh Hamdan 
Sheikha Fatima 
Sheikha Shamma 
Sheikh Zayed 
Sheikha Hassa
Amina - adopted daughter
Salha - adopted daughter

References

External links

20th-century Emirati women
21st-century Emirati women
House of Al Nahyan
Living people
Spouses of presidents of the United Arab Emirates
Year of birth missing (living people)
Women presidents of organizations